Bostrycapulus pritzkeri is a species of sea snail, a marine gastropod mollusk in the family Calyptraeidae, the slipper snails or slipper limpets, cup-and-saucer snails, and Chinese hat snails.

References

Calyptraeidae
Gastropods described in 2005